Latour-en-Woëvre is a commune in the Meuse department in Grand Est in north-eastern France.

Since 2015 it has been twinned with the village Rainhill in the United Kingdom.

See also
Communes of the Meuse department

References

Latourenwoevre